Kim Un-hyang (born 10 December 1992) is a North Korean ice hockey player.

Career
She competed in the 2018 Winter Olympics as part of a unified team of 35 players drawn from both North and South Korea. The team's coach was Sarah Murray and the team was in Group B competing against Switzerland, Japan and Sweden.

References

1992 births
Living people
Ice hockey players at the 2018 Winter Olympics
North Korean women's ice hockey forwards
Olympic ice hockey players of North Korea
Winter Olympics competitors for Korea